Paul Cain (June 16, 1929 – February 12, 2019)  was a Charismatic Christian minister involved with both neo-charismatic churches and the Charismatic Movement. He has been called a prophet. Cain resided in California and ministered monthly at a local church in Santa Maria, California until his death.

Life
Paul Cain was born on June 16, 1929, in Garland, Texas. His mother Anna had been seriously ill with cancer, tuberculosis, and other difficulties, and was not expected to live. Her case was so severe that she was the subject of special medical attention. To the astonishment of doctors both Cain and his mother survived the birth; his mother was subsequently healed. Cain attributes this to an angelic visitation his mother had at that time, and to the fervent prayers of his family. It was during this visitation that Cain was given the name "Paul" and his mother became sure of his calling to preach.

Early ministry
Cain drew crowds of 30,000 in Switzerland and Germany with his meetings. Cain's ministry at this time used a very large tent, like most other ministers' of the time, such as Billy Graham, Oral Roberts and Jack Coe.  Cain, however, eventually became disgusted with what he saw as the corruption of a once-pure movement into a circus of hype and greed. In the late 1950s, he claimed that he was "challenged by the Lord" concerning such excesses of various leaders in that movement, and suddenly disappeared from public view.

Later ministry

He began to travel around the world, proclaiming the gospel and calling the church back to purity and holiness. He served as a consultant to Central Intelligence Agency—Paranormal Division, a consultant to the FBI and was a Presidential Consultant and Special Envoy for three presidents. He ministered to many national and international leaders. During the Clinton Administration, Cain went to Iraq to meet with Saddam Hussein. He also met with spiritual leaders, including key church and denominational leaders.

References

External links
Paul Cain Ministries (Official website)

1929 births
2019 deaths
People from Garland, Texas
American Pentecostal pastors
Religious leaders from Texas
Pentecostals from Texas